The 1976 McNeese State Cowboys football team was an American football team that represented McNeese State University as a member of the Southland Conference (Southland) during the 1976 NCAA Division I football season. In their seventh year under head coach Jack Doland, the team compiled an overall record of 10–2 with a mark of 4–1 in conference play, and were Southland champions. After the regular season, the Cowboys defeated Tulsa in the Independence Bowl.

Schedule

References

McNeese State
Independence Bowl champion seasons
McNeese Cowboys football seasons
Southland Conference football champion seasons
McNeese State Cowboys football